Last Exit may refer to:

Film 
 Last Exit (2003 film), a Danish thriller by David Noel Bourke
 Last Exit (2006 film), a Canadian TV movie starring Kathleen Robertson

Music 
 Last Exit (British band), a 1970s British jazz fusion band
 Last Exit (free jazz band), a 1986–1994 American free-jazz group
 Last Exit (Junior Boys album) or the title song, 2004
 Last Exit (Last Exit album), 1986
 Last Exit (Traffic album), 1969
 The Last Exit, an album by Still Corners, or the title song, 2021
 Last Exit, an album by the Crumbs, 2004
 "Last Exit", a song by Pearl Jam from Vitalogy, 1994

See also 
 Last Exit on Brooklyn, a defunct coffeehouse in Seattle, Washington, US
 Final Exit, a 1991 suicide self-help book by Derek Humphry
 The Final Exit, a 2017 Indian Hindi-language film